Streptacidoidea is an extinct superfamily of fossil sea snails, marine gastropod mollusks in the informal group Lower Heterobranchia.

Taxonomy
 † Family Streptacididae
 † Family Cassianebalidae

References 

Lower Heterobranchia
Prehistoric gastropods